Sirokay is a Hungarian surname. Notable people with the surname include:

 Miklós Sirokay (?–1355/58), Voivod of Transylvania 1342-1344
 László Sirokay (?–1487), Bishop of Nicopolis
 Zsuzsanna Sirokay (born 1941), pianist

See also
Široké

Hungarian-language surnames